The 2011–12 Biathlon World Cup – World Cup 8 will be held in Kontiolahti, Finland, from 10 February until 12 February 2012.

Schedule of events

Medal winners

Men

Women

Mixed

Achievements

 Best performance for all time

 , 2nd place in Sprint
 , 22nd place in Sprint
 , 23rd place in Sprint and 22nd in Pursuit
 , 24th place in Sprint
 , 49th place in Sprint
 , 72nd place in Sprint
 , 84th place in Sprint
 , 85th place in Sprint
 , 3rd place in Pursuit
 , 17th place in Pursuit
 , 44th place in Pursuit
 , 19th place in Sprint
 , 64th place in Sprint
 , 79th place in Sprint
 , 18th place in Pursuit
 , 26th place in Pursuit

 First World Cup race

 , 56th place in Sprint
 , 73rd place in Sprint
 , 44th place in Sprint

References 

- World Cup 8, 2011-12 Biathlon World Cup
Biathlon World Cup - World Cup 8, 2011-12
Kontiolahti
Biathlon competitions in Finland
February 2012 sports events in Europe